Priyan (1964 – 9 November 2017) was an Indian cinematographer who has worked on Tamil language films. Beginning his career as an assistant to Balu Mahendra, Priyan began his career as an independent technician in the 1990s before establishing himself as a leading cinematographer in the Tamil film industry in the 2000s. He is notable in his work with Director Hari. He died due to heart attack in his home.

Career
Priyan was born and raised in Virudhunagar, Tamil Nadu. While he was doing an industrial course in polytechnics, Priyan spent his time with his uncle Ganesan during a summer vacation in Chennai. Having noticed his interest in cinema, his uncle introduced him to his friend K. Balaji, an actor-producer in the Tamil film industry. Priyan subsequently started working in K. Balaji's camera unit and worked for the production house, Sujatha International, for five years as an assistant cinematographer.

Through his work, he was introduced to cinematographer-director Balu Mahendra and worked with him on films including Moondram Pirai (1982), Olangal (1982), Sadma (1983) and Yathra (1984). Moreover, he worked in the cinematography teams of films including Mani Ratnam's Pagal Nilavu (1985) and Nayakan (1987). Priyan then worked in productions by Rajiv Menon and Suresh Menon, collaborating with them for serials and commercials.

Priyan made his debut as an independent cinematographer with K. S. Adhiyaman's Thotta Chinungi (1995), before regularly associating with director Cheran in films including Porkkaalam (1997), Desiya Geetham (1998) and Vetri Kodi Kattu (1999). During the turn of the millennium, Priyan got the opportunity to work on high-profile projects including K. S. Ravikumar's Kamal Haasan-starrer Thenali (2000), Star (2001) and Majunu (2001). Thereafter he has regularly collaborated in films with Hari and has worked on 13 movies barring Venghai (2011), where Priyan was busy working on Velayudham (2011).

Filmography

References

External links
Official website

1964 births
2017 deaths
Tamil film cinematographers
People from Virudhunagar district
Cinematographers from Tamil Nadu